Gianni di Parigi is an 1839 melodramma comico (opera buffa) in two acts with music by Gaetano Donizetti to a libretto by Felice Romani, which had previously been set by Francesco Morlacchi in 1818 and by Giovanni Antonio Speranza in 1836.

It is derived from Jean de Paris, an 1812 opera by François-Adrien Boieldieu with a libretto by Claude Godard d'Aucourt de Saint-Just, which had been performed in Naples in 1816.

Composition history
According to Charles Osborne, the research of Swedish musicologist Anders Wiklund suggests that Donizetti may have begun composing the music for the opera between 1828 and 1830 for a projected performance in Naples which did not occur. It is established with certainty that Donizetti completed the score in 1831, intending it as a vehicle for the popular tenor Giovanni Battista Rubini, who had created the role of Percy in Donizetti's Anna Bolena on 26 December 1830, and to whom Donizetti presented the completed score in 1831. Apparently Rubini did not seriously promote it with opera managements, but somehow it was acquired by Bartolomeo Merelli, who became impresario of La Scala in 1836 and despite the protests of Donizetti produced it there in 1839.

Jeremy Commons, however, points out that Wiklund discovered that in Donizetti's autograph score in the Naples Conservatorio di Musica San Pietro a Majella the overture is clearly dated 1828. Commons notes that the opera's style fits better with florid operas of the 1820s such as Gianni di Calais than with the more romantic 1830s operas such as L'elisir d'amore, and Wiklund suggests that Neapolitan elements in the opera indicate that it was composed in Naples where Donizetti was active in the 1820s. A further score of 1832, with some revisions by the composer (including the omission of the Neapolitan elements), is located in the Casa Ricordi archives in Milan. This may be the score which Donizetti presented to Rubini, who presumably passed it through the hands of Giovanni Ricordi to Merelli.

The sparkling overture includes a theme which is quite similar to that of Don Profondo's aria Medaglie Incomparabili from Il viaggio a Reims by Rossini.

Performance history
The opera premiered on 10 September 1839 at the Teatro alla Scala in Milan, where it received twelve performances. There were seventeen further performances in 1845 at the Teatro Regio (Turin) and ten in 1846 at the Teatro San Carlo in Naples, but it was not staged subsequently until December 1985 in New York by the Vineyard Opera Shop, in a much reduced arrangement for piano, flute, clarinet and bassoon. It was revived by the Donizetti Festival in Bergamo in 1988 and 1991. A new production in 2010 at the Festival della Valle d'Itria at Martina Franca was revived by Wexford Festival Opera in October 2011.

Roles

Synopsis
Place: Provence
Time: 14th century

Pedrigo, an innkeeper from Provence, is preparing his inn for the arrival of the Princess of Navarre who ordered her lunch and lodging in advance, but before her arrival comes a rich citizen from Paris, Gianni, who pays him as twice as much and gets hold of the place. To everyone's surprise, when the princess arrives she accepts the situation with good humor – and that is because she recognizes Gianni as King Philip de Valois's son. Finally both princess and prince (after taking off his disguise) fall in love and are prepared to get married.

Recordings

Scores
An autograph of the score is held at the Conservatorio di San Pietro a Majella in Naples. Since neither of the first two productions were supervised by Donizetti, it reflects changes made by other hands, which are evident from the differences in the two librettos and the presence of considerable non-autograph materials in the Naples score. There is also a score in the Ricordi Archives in Milan with significant autograph additions not found in the one in Naples.

References
Notes

Cited sources

Further reading
Allitt, John Stewart (1991), Donizetti: in the light of Romanticism and the teaching of Johann Simon Mayr, Shaftesbury: Element Books, Ltd (UK); Rockport, MA: Element, Inc.(USA)
Ashbrook, William (1998), "Donizetti, Gaetano" in Stanley Sadie (Ed.), The New Grove Dictionary of Opera, Vol. One. London: MacMillan Publishers, Inc.  
Ashbrook, William and Sarah Hibberd (2001), in Holden, Amanda (Ed.), The New Penguin Opera Guide, New York: Penguin Putnam. . pp. 224–247.
Gelli, Piero (ed.), "Gianni di Parigi", Dizionario dell'Opera, Baldini Castoldi Dalai, 2007, . Accessed online 26 September 2009.
Loewenberg, Alfred (1970). Annals of Opera, 1597-1940, 2nd edition. Rowman and Littlefield
Sadie, Stanley, (Ed.); John Tyrrell (Exec. Ed.) (2004), The New Grove Dictionary of Music and Musicians. 2nd edition. London: Macmillan.  (hardcover).   (eBook).
 Weinstock, Herbert (1963), Donizetti and the World of Opera in Italy, Paris, and Vienna in the First Half of the Nineteenth Century, New York: Pantheon Books.

External links

Donizetti Society (London) website

Operas by Gaetano Donizetti
Italian-language operas
1839 operas
Operas
Opera world premieres at La Scala
Operas set in France
Libretti by Felice Romani